All Saints Church is in Ashgrove Terrace, Lockerbie, Dumfries and Galloway, Scotland.  It is a Category B listed building and an active Scottish Episcopal Church in the Diocese of Glasgow and Galloway.

History
The church was built in 1903 and designed by Douglas and Minshull, a firm of architects from Chester, Cheshire, England.

Architecture
All Saints Church is built in ashlar stone with a red tile roof. Its plan consists of a low nave with aisles, a higher chancel with a canted end, a south porch and a tower at the west end. The tower has a broach spire with Westmorland slates.  The stained glass includes a memorial window by Morris & Co.

See also
List of new churches by John Douglas

References

Churches in Dumfries and Galloway
Episcopal church buildings in Scotland
Churches completed in 1903
20th-century Anglican church buildings
Category B listed buildings in Dumfries and Galloway
Listed churches in Scotland
Lockerbie, All Saints Church
Gothic Revival church buildings in Scotland
Lockerbie